Hinstock is a civil parish in Shropshire, England.  It contains eight listed buildings that are recorded in the National Heritage List for England.  All the listed buildings are designated at Grade II, the lowest of the three grades, which is applied to "buildings of national importance and special interest".  The parish contains the village of Hinstock and the surrounding countryside.  The listed buildings consist of a church, a memorial in the churchyard, a farmhouse, a house with a pump and basin, two milestones, and a folly.


Buildings

References

Citations

Sources

Lists of buildings and structures in Shropshire